Wu Shaoxiang is a Chinese contemporary sculptor living between Berlin, Beijing and Carinthia, Austria.

Biography 
Wu Shaoxiang was born in 1957 in Jiangxi Province, China. Having only received ongoing formal education until he was twelve, Wu was sent to work on a farm to lay bricks and saw wood for rafters. It was only when he turned twenty-one that he could he begin his career as a sculptor.

From 1978-1982 Wu studied sculpture at the Jingdezhen Ceramics Institute, then left to work at the China National Design Association in Beijing for two years. From 1984-1987, he pursued postgraduate studies under the sculptor Professor Zheng Ke, at the Central Academy of Arts and Design, now the Central Academy of Fine Arts, Tsinghua University, Beijing, China. After graduating with a master's degree, he taught as a lecturer at the academy.

An important figure in China's New-Wave art movement, Wu won the first scholarship awarded by the city of Beijing, and was named one of the "Ten Most Influential Chinese Avant-Garde Artists" by Fine Arts of China (the most important magazine at the time for modern art published in China). The purpose behind the New-Wave group was to review traditional Chinese art through courageous experimentation in the face of the ever-increasing influence of Western culture, in order to bring Chinese art to the modern world. In 1988, the National Art Museum of China organized its first major solo exhibition, and in the same year, he was the first modern Chinese artist to be allowed to place a sculpture - "Meditation" - in a public space in Europe. On June 6, 1989, two days after the massacre on Tiananmen Square, he was able to leave China with the help of the Austrian Embassy. He settled in Austria with his wife Jiang Shuo, who is also a sculptor, and their son. In 1991, he created "Apple," his first sculpture made entirely of coins. It was included in the Guinness World Records Book 1995 and is now in the Austrian National Bank. He obtained Austrian citizenship in 1993 and published a book of his sculptures since his arrival in Europe. He exhibited at this time in Europe and Asia. After cancer treatment in 1996 he built a new studio in Carinthia with his wife Jiang Shuo and wrote the autobiographical novel "The Shadow of the Sun". In 2006, he set up a studio in Beijing, and later he published "Art of Sculpture," which became a textbook for all Chinese universities. He is a visiting professor at the Academy of Fine Arts of Fu Dan University in Shanghai since 2008. Due to its increasing popularity, 2012 saw the opening of a studio in Berlin. Alternating Wu Shaoxiang lives today in Austria, Berlin and Beijing. 2017 he became a visiting professor at Tianjin Academy of Fine Arts. His works are also widely collected by museums and prestigious institutions worldwide.

Early works
The artist's work first caught the attention of the public through several modern abstract sculptures, which were commissioned for several locations, including a Beijing park, the Theatre of the Chinese Association of the Arts, and the Central Academy of Science. In his early stage as a sculptor, Wu was influenced by Western modernism. His "Outcry Series" created during the mid-1980s resembled the stylistic representation of sculptors such as Arp and Brâncuși, as well as Duchampe's his ironic sculptures and the artistic method of Chinese impressionism. This series was noted at the time for their abstract presentation of the female body, and representation of sexual consciousness. It was made mainly of cast copper, which was polished to diminish the strength of the material, creating a smooth and luminous tactile experience. Such work indicated the lack of exploration in sexual themes in China, establishing Wu as an artistic pioneer at that time.

Wu was also an active participant in the Chinese modern art circle. He wanted to provide greater international exposure to Chinese art, and avidly explored and incorporated contemporary ideas in his works. In this sense, he was much bolder compared to his more conservative and conventional contemporaries who were hesitant in addressing sexual themes. As a result, he helped to begin a new chapter in modern Chinese art history.

In Austria Wu found a more liberal environment that allowed him the freedom to artistically express himself. He attempted to detach himself from the art movement in China, but found it a challenge. This made him feel like a foreigner both in China and in Austria. Thus, it would become inevitable for Wu to return to his identity, but keeping a global perspective. Some themes he explored included the concept of Yin and Yang – which relates to Chinese philosophy and traditional Chinese medicine.

Later works
Living abroad allowed Wu to become more familiar with the relationship between art and commerce. He also witnessed what he felt were the detrimental effects of globalization on art. When visiting museums, Wu saw works by artists he respected as important voices of change commercialized and degraded to simple brand names, as their creations were reproduced on all types of consumer products.

The development of his past work along with a greater awareness of consumer culture enabled Wu to create his "Coin Series" in 1991, where he used coins as a medium for sculpting. For example, Apple, made up of 45,000 Austrian shilling coins, is recorded in The Guinness Book of Records in 1995 as the first and biggest coin sculpture in the world.

He uses coins to produce interpretations of both Western and Chinese sculptural forms, including Mao Zedong, Deng Xiaoping, Bill Gates, the Roman goddess of love, Venus, the logo of McDonald's, and a can of Coca-Cola. This would allow him to convey a strong social message, and to establish his individual artistic signature on the international art stage, earning him prominent recognition.

For his first solo exhibition -Coining MOMA(2001)- in the United States at Plum Blossoms gallery in New York, Wu Shaoxiang rendered with wielded coins his own representation of the permanent collection at The Museum of Modern Art, for example taking inspiration from Pablo Picasso, Alberto Giacometti, Aristide Maillol and Jasper Johns. In doing so, he was indicating that enterprises such as the MoMA were increasingly driven by business, carrying out nationwide publicity campaigns and reproducing famous works on gift items to sell them in museum shops. In fact, they had reduced artistic images to commercial images.

In his latest work, the "Walking Wealth" series, Wu continues to explore the theme of wealth and modern consumer culture, though this time using a new form of innovative sculptural representation - life-sized human figures made out of bronze-cast US dollar notes. As a postmodernist he had to deconstruct his "tradition" or reinterpret the "tradition" of his artistic education. Selecting the historical masterpieces of Western art - which are familiar to most educated Westerners - he could express the themes of his metaphorical messages in a more accessible way. With their unique body language and presentation, these anonymous figures are amusing commentaries on mankind's seemingly immense hunger for monetary fulfillment. In his worlds: "Inventions can free people from physical restrictions, but also lead to unexpected new restrictions. Currency is like this: It was invented to facilitate trade, but it came to dominate people's behavior and reasoning in the end. Coins can be used as a kind of normal material such as stone, wood or metal to make sculptures". The idea of money - illustrated by the coins and banknotes he uses  - is in his mind completely incompatible with the actual value of the art.

The exact interpretation of his works, however, is still unclear and fuzzy, probably intentionally. In the history of sculpture, he is the first to use coins exclusively and persistently to make sculptures, going beyond the traditional definition of this art. The raw material used is material substance, but also an art form in itself.

Completed in 2007, his sculpture I Love M depicts a bust of Chairman Mao mounted on a plinth with the McDonald's logo. At the same time as referencing his childhood during the Cultural Revolution, I Love M is a commentary on the pervasiveness of capitalism and the way political figures become symbols over time.

Selected solo exhibitions

Time Meteorite: Wu Shaoxiang Sculpture Works, Art Tianjin, Beijing Park, Tianjin, China, 2017
Wu Shaoxiang, 30 years Exploration on the Art of Sculpture, Jiangxi Art Museum, Nanchang, China, 2016
Desire Scenery - Retrospective, Tianjin Academy of Fine Arts, China, 2015
Desire Scenery - Retrospective, Today Art Museum, Beijing, China, 2015
Invisible Hand, together with Jiang Shuo, Linda Art Centre, 798, Beijing, China, 2015
Dolls and Masks, National Museum of Indonesia, Jakarta, Indonesia, 2014
Red VS Green, together with Jiang Shuo, Werner Berg Museum, Bleiburg, Austria, 2014
Dolls and Masks, together with Jiang Shuo, Museum of Contemporary Art, Singapore, 2014
Going for The Money, together with Jiang Shuo, Plum Blossoms Gallery, Hong Kong, 2014
Camouflage, together with Jiang Shuo, Plum Blossoms Gallery, Hong Kong, 2013
Going Forward! Going for Money!, Museum of Contemporary Art, Taipei, Taiwan, 2012
Sculpture from China, Marsvinsholms skulpturpark, Sweden, 2011
This Land so rich in Beauty, Plum Blossoms Gallery, Hong Kong, 2011
Let's talk about money, Z-Art Centre, Shanghai, China, 2010
Going Forward! Going for Money!, together with Jiang Shuo, Museum of Contemporary Art, Singapore, 2010
New Age Cadre, White 8 Gallery, Vienna, Austria, 2010
Tao Hua yuan, 798 Linda Gallery, Beijing, China, 2009
Paradise Fruits, Art Seasons, Zurich, Switzerland, 2008
Walking Wealth, Plum Blossoms Gallery, Hong Kong, 2008
Jiang Shuo and Wu Shaoxiang Exhibition at Songzhuang Museum, Beijing, China, 2007
Chase, Linda Gallery, Singapore, 2006
Chase, Linda Gallery, Jakarta, Indonesia, 2006
Sculptures and Paintings, Schloss Gabelhofen, Fohnsdorf, Austria, 2003
Coining MoMA, Plum Blossoms Gallery, New York City, USA, 2001
Wu Shaoxiang and Jiang Shuo, Schloss Wolfsberg, Wolfsberg, Austria, 2001
Coining, AAI Gallery, Vienna, Austria, 2001
Sculptures and Paintings, Gallery Synarte, Klagenfurt, Austria, 2000
Wu Shaoxiang, Gallery Dida, Graz, Austria, 1999
Red Memory, Plum Blossoms Gallery, Hong Kong, 1999
Sculptures and Paintings, Salzburg Art Fair, Salzburg, Austria, 1999
Wu Shaoxiang, Gallery Daghofer, Leoben, Austria, 1998
Blander and Wu Shaoxiang, Funda Gallery, St.Veit/GL, Austria, 1998
Wu Shaoxiang and Jiang Shuo, Gallery Zentrum, Graz, Austria, 1997
Wu Shaoxiang and Jiang Shuo, Shellanda Company, Klagenfurt, Austria, 1997
Sculptor, The Rotunda, Exchange Square, Hong Kong, 1996
Wu Shaoxiang-New Works, Gallery Kolly, Graz, Austria, 1996
 The Art of Coining, Hanart Gallery, Taipei, Taiwan, 1995
Recent Sculptures, Plum Blossoms Gallery, Hong Kong, 1994
Sculptures and Paintings, Gallery Zentrum, Graz, Austria, 1993
Sculptures and Paintings, Europe House, Klagenfurt, Austria, 1993
Sculptures and Paintings, Gallery Nemenz, Judenberg, Austria, 1992
Sculptures and Paintings, Gallery Akzent K, Stuttgart, Germany, 1991
Sculptures, Gallery d' Art Teroema, Florence, Italy, 1991
Apple, Messe Palast, Vienna, Austria, 1991
Sculptures and Paintings, Gallery Burg Montendorf, Salzburg, Austria, 1991
Sculptures and Paintings, Raiffeisen Gallery, Klagenfurt, Austria, 1991
 Joint exhibition with Jiang Shuo, Culture House, Knittelfeld, Austria, 1991
Sculptures and Paintings, City Hall Gallery, Klagenfurt, Austria, 1990
Dream, China National Art Gallery, Beijing, China, 1988
Sculptures, Central Academy of Arts and Design, Beijing, China, 1987
Two and Three Dimension, joined by Chen Xiaoyu, Central Academy of Fine Arts, Beijing, China, 1985

Group exhibitions  

 Chinese Dreams: Yi Kai and Wu Shaoxiang, Alisan Fine Arts, Hong Kong, 2018
 Redefining the City with Context • Beyond the Wall: Xi’an Contemporary Art Exhibition 2018, Xi’an Art Museum, Xi’an, China, 2018
Money in Art, Kunst im Traklhaus, Salzburg, Austria, 2018
Insight, Pingshan International Sculpture Exhibition, Shenzhen, China, 2018
Art Basel, Presented by Alisan Fine Art Gallery, Hong Kong, 2018
Art Stage Singapore, Presented by Linda Gallery, Singapore, 2018
Art & Antique Vienna, Vienna, Austria Schütz Fine Art-Chinese Department, 2018
Fair for Art Vienna, Vienna, Austria Schütz Fine Art-Chinese Department, 2018
Art & Antique Residenz Salzburg (March and August), Salzburg, Austria, Schütz Fine Art-Chinese Department Art & Antique, 2018
Art Vienna, Leopold Museum, Vienna, Austria Schütz Fine Art-Chinese Department, 2017
Art & Antique Residenz Salzburg (March and August), Salzburg, Austria, Schütz Fine Art-Chinese Department Art & Antique, 2017
Art & Antique Vienna, Vienna, Austria Schütz Fine Art-Chinese Department, 2017
Contemporary Chinese Art, Vienna, Austria Schütz Fine Art-Chinese Department, 2017
Art & Antique Hofburg Vienna, Vienna, Austria Schütz Fine Art-Chinese Department, 2017
Art & Antique Residence Salzburg (March and August), Salzburg, Austria, Schütz Fine Art-Chinese Department, 2016
Art Miami New York, Schütz Fine Art-Chinese Department, 2016
2015 Art Salzburg, Austria, Schütz Fine Art-Chinese Department, 2015
Olympia Art Fair, Olympia, London, England, Schütz Fine Art-Chinese Department 2015
Art & Antique Residenz Salzburg (March and August), Salzburg, Austria, Schütz Fine Art-Chinese Department, 2015
20 years Schütz Fine Art, Schütz Fine Art, Vienna, Austria, 2015
Art & Antique Hofburg Vienna, Austria, Schütz Fine Art-Chinese Department, 2015
 Art Landing Singapore, Presented by Linda Gallery, Singapore, 2014
Da Xiang You xin - Contemporary Chinese Sculpture Today, Songzhuan Art Centre, Beijing, China, 2013
Art Beijing, Agriculture Exhibition Hall, Beijing, China, Linda Gallery, 2013
Art Beijing, Agriculture Exhibition Hall, Beijing, China, Linda Gallery, 2012
Art Taipei, Taiwan, Linda Gallery, 2012
ART Beijing, Agriculture Exhibition Hall, Beijing, China, Linda Gallery, 2011
International Gallery Exposition, China World Trade Centre, Beijing, China, presented by Linda Gallery, 2010
Greeting with their Heart and Blood, 798 Linda Art Centre, Beijing, China, 2010
ART Santa Fe, El Museo Cultural de Santa Fe, New Mexico, USA, Plum Blossoms Gallery, 2009
Singapore Art Fair, Singapore, Linda Gallery, 2009
ART Singapore, SUNTEC Singapore, Singapore, Linda Gallery, 2008
Shanghai Art Fair 2007, Shanghai, China, 2007
ARTSingapore 2007, The Contemporary Asian Art Fair, Singapore, 2007
Art Beijing 2007, Beijing, China, 2007
China International Gallery Exposition 2007, Beijing, China, 2007
ArtSingapore 2006, Singapore, 2006
The International Asian Art Fair, The Armoury, New York, USA, 2003
Sculptures, Elizabeth Weiner Fine Art Gallery, Santa Monica, California, USA, 2003
The International Asian Art Fair, Lincoln Art Centre, New York, USA, 2002
Configurations, Plum Blossoms Gallery, New York, Hong Kong, 2002
International Biennial of Contemporary Art Austria, Hüttenberg, Austria, 2002
The International Asian Art Fair, The Armoury, New York, USA, 2001
The International Pavilion of Palm Beach, Art Palm Beach, Florida, USA, 2001
Salon de Mars, Geneva, Switzerland, 2001
Chinese Figure, Hanart Gallery, Hong Kong, 2000
The International Asian Art Fair, The Armoury, New York, USA, 2000
The 20th Century Art, The Armoury, New York, USA, 2000
The International Contemporary Art Fair, Los Angeles, USA, 1999
Goedhuis Contemporary, London, United Kingdom, 2000
The International Contemporary Art Fair, Palace Degli Affari, Florence, Italy, 1998
Contemporary Austrian Painter, The Rotunda, Exchange Square, Hong Kong, 1998
The International Asian Art Fair, The Armoury, New York, USA, 1997
Contemporary Austrian Painter, The Rotunda, Exchange Square, Hong Kong, 1997
Table for Two, LKF Gallery, Hong Kong, 1996
The Collector's View, Hanart Gallery, Hong Kong, 1996
Art Asia, Hong Kong Convention and Exhibition Centre, Hong Kong, 1995
Budapest Art Expo, Budapest, Hungary, 1995
New Trends Art Hong Kong, Hong Kong Convention and Exhibition Centre, Hong Kong, 1994
Tresors Singapore, World Trade Centre, Singapore, 1994
Art Asia, Hong Kong Convention and Exhibition Centre, presented by Plum Blossoms Gallery, Hong Kong, 1994
The Spirit of Times, Gallery Hinteregger, St. Pölten, Austria, 1993
Packaged Art, Bündner Art Museum, Chur, Switzerland, 1990
International Art Exhibition, Stadgarden Gallery, Norden, Germany, 1990
Avant-garde China, China National Art Gallery, Beijing, China, 1989
New Expressionism in China, China National History Museum, Beijing, China, 1989
30 Years The Central Academy of Arts & Design, Central Academy of Arts and Design, Beijing, China, 1988
Works by Young Beijing Artist, China National Art Gallery, Beijing, China, 1987
Contemporary Chinese Fine Art, Toronto Exhibition Hall, Toronto, Canada, 1987
Excellent Chinese Urban Sculptures, China National Art Gallery, Beijing, China, 1987
Tradition and Modern - New Sculptures, China National Art Gallery, Beijing, China, 1987
National Sculpture Exhibition, China National Art Gallery, Beijing, China, 1986
New Works from Jingdezhen Ceramics Institute, Jingdezhen, 1982
 Ceramics Museum, Jingdezhen, China, 1982
Jiang Xi Province Art Exhibition, Jiang Xi Revolution Museum, Nanchang, China, 1981
National Art Academy's Drawing Exhibition, China Art Academy, Hangzhou, China, 1981

Selected works 

 Torso from the Louvre, bronze, 139  x 58 x 34 cm, Schütz Fine Art - Chinese Department, Vienna, Austria, 2018 
 Naked Nike, bronze and stainless steel, 178 x 60 x 75 cm, Schütz Fine Art - Chinese Department, Vienna, Austria, 2016
 Fruits of Paradise, patinated bronze, 92 x 111 x 60 cm, Schütz Fine Art - Chinese Department, Vienna, Austria, 2008. Collaboration with Jiang Shuo
 Coining MoMA- Brâncuși, Tree, H.M.Z. Foundation, Fohnsdo, 2003
 Coining MOMA-Maillol. Shilling coins, 95 x 58 x 43 cm. 2001. Schütz Fine Art - Chinese Department, Vienna, Austria, 2001-2006
 Head From British Museum, Bowl, Torso, Cyber Club, Hong Kong, 2003
 Family III (fountain), Singulus, Umag, Croatia, 2003
 Harmonious (fountain), Ebental District Government, Ebenthal, Austria, 2002
 Harmonious (fountain), Wolkensberg Foundation, Klagenfurt, Austria, 2002
 Clouds VI, Celebrity Cruises, Miami, United States, 2002
 Torso From Louvre, RBB Bank Spittal, Spittal an der Drau, Austria, 2002
 Deng Xiaoping Souvenir Badge, Wadsworth Collection, New York, United States, 2001
 Patrick, Schloss Pakein, Grafenstein, Austria, 2001
 Pomegrante, Barmherzigen Bruder Hospital, St. Veit, Austria, 2001
 Circulate, Volksbank Karnten Sud, Klagenfurt, Austria, 2001
 Fountain, Villa Ried, St.Veit, Austria, 2000    
 Mao, Venus From British Museum, Crow Art Museum, Dallas, United States, 1999
 Head From Gugenheim, Kärnten State Government, Carinthia, Austria, 1999
 Man On Peach, Hypo Landesbank, Klagenfurt, Austria, 1999
 Goddess, Leoben City Government, Leoben, Austria, 1998
 Venus, RBB Bank, Klagenfurt, Austria, 1998
 Cloud, Villa Borovnik, Ferlach, Austria, 1998
 Goddess, Beijing Silver Tower, Beijing, China, 1998
 The Moon, LKH 2000 Sculpture Park, Karnten State Government, Klagenfurt, Austria, 1997
 Gentle Breath, Björn Borg Collection, Stockholm, Sweden, 1997
 Coin, Control Bank, Vienna, Austria, 1997
 Venus, RBB Bank, Klagenfurt, Austria, 1997
 Sepe, State Icehockey Hall, Klagenfurt, Austria, 1997
 Family (fountain), Starmann Company, Klagenfurt, Austria, 1996
 Enjoyable (fountain), County Attendant Centre, County Government, Moosburg, Austria, 1996
 Torso, Schwarzneger Art collection, Los Angeles, United States, 1996
 Winged Source (fountain), Ford Sintsching, Klagenfurt, Austria, 1995
 Banana, Hanart Gallery, Hong Kong, 1995
 The Moon, Renaissance Hotel, Hong Kong, 1995
 The Great Venus of 20th Century, New World Centre, Kowloon, Hong Kong, 1995
 Gentle Breath, New World Hotel, Shenzhen, China, 1995
 Harmonius, italian marmor, 46 x 56 x 15 cm, Schütz Fine Art - Chinese Department, Vienna, Austria, 1994
 The Seed of Jade, RBB Bank, Klagenfurt, Austria, 1994
 The Great Venus of 20th Century, Wing on Art Collection St. Paul, De Veuce, France, 1994
 Head, Klagenfurt City Gallery, Klagenfurt, Austria, 1994
 Inner Movement, DAF Aichwalder, Klagenfurt, Austria, 1993
 Flutist, House Hinteregger, St. Pölten, Austria, 1993
 Turning Figure, City Government, St.Veit/Glan, Austria, 1993
 Window, Raiffeisen Lands Bank, Klagenfurt, Austria, 1993
 Hand (Fountain), Köck Villa, Velden, Austria, 1992
 Telephon, Gallery Akzent K, Stuttgart, Germany, 1992
 Apple, National Bank, Vienna, Austria, 1991
 Sitting Girl, Treibach Sport Centre, Treibach, Austria, 1991
 Heavenly Dog, Hardy Collection Museum, Pörtschach, Austria, 1991
 Turning Figure, Karnten State Culture Council, Klagenfurt, Austria, 1991
 Gentle Breath, Oesterreichische Nationalbank, Vienna, Austria, 1990
 Dancing Spirit, Stroh Centre, Klagenfurt, Austria, 1990
 Family (fountain), local government, St Veit, Austria, 1989
 Victory, The Revolution Monument, Shijiazhuang City, Shijiazhuang, China, 1988
 City Symbol Sculpture, Luzhu City, China, 1988
 Meditation, Europe Sculpture Park, Klagenfurt, Austria, 1988
 The Four Feelings, China Association of letters and Arts, Beijing, China, 1987
 The See of Knowledge, Central University of Finance, Beijing, China, 1987
 Masks, Beijing International Hotel, Beijing, China, 1987
 Bath, The Central Academy of Arts and Design, Beijing, China, 1987
 Spring, Bin River Park, Beijing City Government, Beijing, China, 1986

See also 
 Jiang Shuo
 Central Academy of Fine Arts

Bibliography 

 Gao Minglu (2010). Wu Shaoxiang Works. Shuimu Art Space, Beijing.
 Linda Ma (2016). Invisible Hand. Linda Gallery, Beijing.
 Linda Ma (2014). Wu Shaoxiang & Jiang Shuo. Linda Gallery, Beijing.
 Xu Liang (2016). Wu Shaoxiang, Collected Works. Today Art Museum Publishing House LTD, Beijing.
 McGuinness Stephen (2003). Wu Shaoxiang. Plum Blossoms Gallery, New York, Hong Kong, Singapore.
 Xu Liang (2015). Wu Shaoxiang. Today Art Museum Publishing House LTD, Beijing.

References

External links 
 Werner Berg Museum, Red Vs. Green 
 Schütz Fine Art, Wu Shaoxiang
 Schilling, Mark, Dollar, Euro und … Geld in der Kunst (25. 7. bis 15. 9. 2018) Land Salzburg

Living people
Chinese sculptors
Artists from Jiangxi
1957 births